(translation: Opponent of religion,
lit. Antireligionist, was a monthly scientific and methodical atheistic magazine in Russian, the organ of the Central Council of the League of Militant Atheists of the USSR, and was published in Moscow from January 1926 to June 1941.

The editor of the publication was Y. M. Yaroslavsky.  systematically covered the experience of the atheistic work of the League of Militant Atheists, published articles on the history of religion and atheism, propagated scientific atheism, and addressed from a Marxist standpoint questions of criticism of religion.

 had a volume of about 130 pages, consisting of articles with headings such as "Anti-religious education in school", "Letters from the field", "Chronicle", "Methodology of anti-religious propaganda", and "Criticism and bibliography." Among the magazine's authors were V. D. Bonch-Bruevich, N. K. Krupskaya, A. T. Lukachevsky (deputy editor), and activists of the League of Militant Atheists. The section "Chronicle" contained detailed information on the League of Militant Atheists' actions in various regions of the USSR. In the section "Criticism and Bibliography", reviews were published on books of anti-religious content (Ateist, Bezbozhnik and others), and reviews of current publications on atheistic topics were given. The magazine developed the ideological foundations of mass atheist propaganda, directed primarily against Orthodoxy carried out through the lower organizations (cells) of the LMG.  also published articles and notes directed against Catholicism and Protestantism.

After 1960, the USSR published the magazine  (lit. Science and Religion).

See also 

 Bezbozhnik (newspaper)
 Council for Religious Affairs
 Persecutions of the Catholic Church and Pius XII
 Persecution of Christians in the Soviet Union
 Persecution of Muslims in the former USSR
 Religion in the Soviet Union
 State atheism
 USSR anti-religious campaign (1928–1941)

References

Magazines established in 1926
1941 disestablishments in the Soviet Union
Magazines published in Moscow
1926 establishments in the Soviet Union
Magazines disestablished in 1941
Monthly magazines published in Russia
Atheism publications
Magazines published in the Soviet Union
Russian-language magazines
Propaganda in the Soviet Union
Anti-religious campaign in the Soviet Union
Anti-Christian sentiment in Europe
Anti-Christian sentiment in Asia
Propaganda newspapers and magazines
Persecution of Muslims
Religious persecution by communists
Anti-Islam sentiment in the Soviet Union